Attleboro station is a commuter rail station on the MBTA's Providence/Stoughton Line located in Attleboro, Massachusetts. By a 2018 count, Attleboro had 1,547 daily riders, making it the fourth busiest station on the system outside Boston.

Attleboro has had railroad service to its downtown area continuously since 1835. The two-story northbound and southbound station buildings, now private businesses, were built during a grade crossing elimination project in 1906-1908 and added to the National Register of Historic Places in 1989. MBTA trains stop at platforms located slightly south of the historic buildings.

Attleboro is an important transfer station for the Greater Attleboro Taunton Regional Transit Authority, with seven routes converging at the adjacent Attleboro Intermodal Transportation Center.

History

Early history

The original Boston and Providence Railroad station, a complex Victorian Gothic building, was located north of Mill Street at a grade crossing. Service began in June 1835 from Boston to Providence. Two branches opened from Attleboro: The Attleboro Branch Railroad (run by the B&P) opened in January 1870, followed by the New Bedford and Taunton Railroad's Attleboro Branch (to Taunton) in August 1871.

The Boston & Providence was taken over by the Old Colony Railroad in 1888, which itself was absorbed by the New York, New Haven and Hartford Railroad in 1893. The lease of the Attleboro Branch Railroad expired in 1901; the New Haven built a different connector to the Walpole and Wrentham Railroad and the branch was returned to its owners. It was converted to an interurban trolley line locally known as the "Gee Whiz Line" in June 1903. Taken over by the Rhode Island Company in 1907, service lasted as long as 1932. The town plans to convert part of the right of way into a recreational trail.

New station

In 1891, the town petitioned the New Haven Railroad to eliminate dangerous grade crossings in the town.  In 1905, the railroad set out to construct a lengthy viaduct for the mainline and the branch to Taunton.  The project removed 13 grade crossings and made the line four tracks through Attleboro - one of the few locations east of New Haven where the railroad completed quadruple-tracking plans.  Two-story Romanesque station buildings were built on both sides; the northbound building opened in 1906 and the larger southbound building two years later.

Service on the branch to Taunton lasted until 1958, with summer-only long-distance service to Cape Cod lasting until 1964. In April 1979, off-peak MBTA service to Providence was cut back to Attleboro due to a reduction in subsidy from the state of Rhode Island. All service was cut to Attleboro on February 20, 1981.

MBTA era

The station served Amtrak's Cape Codder during the summers of 1986 to 1988, with the Cape Cod and Hyannis Railroad operating additional state-funded service from Attleboro to Hyannis in 1988.  The CC&HR stopped operation after the 1988 season due to elimination of state subsidies. The Cape Codder discontinued its Attleboro stop in 1989 as it served just 3 riders per train, though the service ran until 1996.

Rush hour MBTA service was restored to Providence on February 1, 1988. Off-peak and weekend service was extended to  upon its opening on June 20, 1990; those trains were later extended to Providence under expanded funding agreements. On January 5, 1989, the station buildings were added to the National Register of Historic Places. Both buildings are owned by private businesses. On January 16, 1989, the MBTA began a $990k renovation project, which included the installation of mini-high platforms to make the station accessible. The station was accessible by late 1990. The MBTA began operating Providence– service for events at Gillette Stadium in 1997, with Attleboro as one of the intermediate stops.

A 782-space garage was planned around 1999 to deal with overcrowding in the surface parking lots, but was never built. The Attleboro Intermodal Transportation Center was opened on November 7, 2013 to provide better connections between local bus and commuter rail services. The facility includes dedicated busways and a waiting room located on the west side of the railroad viaduct.

A  section of non-electrified platform sidings at Attleboro, not included in the initial Amtrak electrification, is being electrified in mid-2022 to support future electric MBTA operations.

Bus connections

GATRA operates seven local bus routes connecting to the station:
Route 10 -  Attleboro to North Attleboro 
Route 12 - South Attleboro to Attleboro 
Route 14 - Attleboro to Plainville 
Route 15 - Oak Hill 
Route 16 - Seekonk to Attleboro 
Route 18 - Attleboro, Norton, and Taunton
Route 24 - Attleboro to Pawtucket

See also
National Register of Historic Places listings in Bristol County, Massachusetts

References

External links

MBTA - Attleboro
 Mill Street entrance from Google Maps Street View
 Main Street entrance from Google Maps Street View

Stations on the Northeast Corridor
MBTA Commuter Rail stations in Bristol County, Massachusetts
Attleboro, Massachusetts
Former Amtrak stations in Massachusetts
Romanesque Revival architecture in Massachusetts
Railway stations in the United States opened in 1835
Railway stations on the National Register of Historic Places in Massachusetts
National Register of Historic Places in Bristol County, Massachusetts
Former New York, New Haven and Hartford Railroad stations
1835 establishments in Massachusetts